First Love is a 1795 sentimental comedy play by the British playwright Richard Cumberland. It was first performed at the Drury Lane Theatre in May 1795. Frederick Mowbray becomes the protector of Sabrina Rosny after her abandonment by Lord Sensitive.

The original Drury Lane cast included Richard Wroughton as Lord Sensitive, Thomas King as Sir Miles Mowbray, John Palmer as Frederick Mowbray, John Bannister as David, Robert Palmer as Mr Wrangle, Richard Suett as Billy Bustler, Elizabeth Farren as Lady Ruby, Jane Pope as Mrs Wrangle, Charlotte Tidswell as Mrs Kate and Dorothea Jordan as Sabrina Rosny.

References

Bibliography
 Hogan, C.B (ed.) The London Stage, 1660–1800: Volume V. Southern Illinois University Press, 1968.
 Mudford, William. The Life of Richard Cumberland. Sherwood, Neely & Jones, 1812.
 Nicoll, Allardyce. A History of English Drama 1660-1900. Volume III: Late Eighteenth Century Drama. Cambridge University Press, 1952.

Plays by Richard Cumberland
1795 plays
Comedy plays
West End plays